The Billie Jean King Cup (or the BJK Cup) is the premier international team competition in women's tennis, launched as the Federation Cup in 1963 to celebrate the 50th anniversary of the International Tennis Federation (ITF). The name was changed to the Fed Cup in 1995, and changed again in September 2020 in honor of former World No. 1 Billie Jean King. The Billie Jean King Cup is the world's largest annual women's international team sports competition in terms of the number of nations that compete. The current Chairperson is Katrina Adams.

The Czech Republic dominated the BJK Cup in the 2010s, winning six of ten competitions in the decade. The men's equivalent of the Billie Jean King Cup is the Davis Cup, and the Czech Republic, Australia, Russia and the United States are the only countries to have held both Cups at the same time.

After the 2022 Russia invasion of Ukraine, the International Tennis Federation suspended Russia and Belarus from Billie Jean King Cup competitions.

History 

In 1919, Hazel Hotchkiss Wightman had an idea for a women's team tennis competition. This was not adopted but she persisted, presenting a trophy at the 1923 annual contest between the United States and Great Britain, named the Wightman Cup.

Nell Hopman, wife of the legendary Australian Davis Cup Captain Harry Hopman, later took up Mrs Wightman's original idea. In 1962, a British resident of the United States, Mary Hardwick Hare, presented a dossier proving that support for such an event was overwhelming, persuading the ITF that it was a 'good idea' to have a team championship played over one week in a different venue each year. 40 years after Wightman's idea of a women's Davis Cup, it became a reality. In 1963, the ITF launched the Federation Cup to celebrate its 50th anniversary. Open to all nations the competition became a resounding success.

The inaugural event attracted 16 countries. The competition was supported by the top players right from the start. Held at the Queen's Club, in London, the first contest was between Australia and the United States.  Grand Slam champions Darlene Hard, Billie Jean King, Margaret Smith and Lesley Turner all proudly representing their country on court. The United States would emerge the champion nation in the opening year. However, it was to be Australia in the early years, winning seven of the next eleven championships. Around 1980 the United States was able to establish some significant mark on the competition setting in future years a very high standard for others to compete against.

The first Federation Cup had attracted 16 entry teams, despite no prize money and teams having to meet their own expenses. When sponsorship became available, the number of teams expanded dramatically, first by the Colgate Group in 1976, and, from 1981 to 1994 by the Japanese communications and computer giant NEC. In 1994, there were 73 nations competing, with the host nation of a Federation Cup week was now being required to build a special tennis complex, giving rise to what became known as the Federation Cup "legacy." The additional costs of each event could be offset with the host nations viewing their involvement as providing an opportunity to boost their national game.

For the 1992, a regional group qualifying format was introduced. In 1995, the tournament's name was shortened to the Fed Cup, and a new home-and-away format was adopted as trialled by the Davis Cup, so that women could play for their country in their own country. There have been a number of smaller changes to the format since 1995. The format change implemented in 2005 incorporates an eight Nation World Group I and eight nation World Group II both playing home-and-away over three weekends throughout the year. Three regional groups compete and there are promotions and relegations based on results.

The 2021 edition is set to have US$12 million in prize money.

After the 2022 Russia invasion of Ukraine, the International Tennis Federation suspended Russia and Belarus from Billie Jean King Cup competitions.

Format

Tournament 
While many nations enter the BJK Cup each year, only 16 countries qualify for the elite World Group and World Group II each year (eight in World Group and eight in World Group II).

They reach World Group and World Group II as follows:

(a) World Group – the four nations that win their World Group first round tie remain in the World Group for the following year. First round losers contest the World Group Play-offs against the four winning nations from World Group II to determine relegation/promotion for the following year's competition. (The four nations that win World Group Play-offs will be in the World Group the following year, while the four losers will start the following year in World Group II.)
(b) World Group II – the four nations that win their World Group II ties will compete in the World Group I Play-Offs to determine relegation/promotion for the following year, as described above. Similarly the four nations that lose their World Group II ties will face winning nations from Group I Zonal competitions, in the World Group II Play-offs, to determine relegation/promotion. (The four nations that win their World Group II Play-offs will be in World Group II the following year, while the four losers will begin the next year in Group I Zonal events.)

Once in the World Group or World Group II, four nations will be seeded in each. The decision as to which nations will be seeded is made by the BJK Cup Committee, according to the ITF BJK Cup Nations Ranking.

At the levels below the World Group and World Group II, the BJK Cup nations compete in Zonal Competition events, which are split into three zones: The Americas Zone, the Asia/Oceania Zone and the Europe/Africa Zone. In each zone there are two groups, Group I being the higher and Group II the lower, except for the Europe/Africa Zone, which also has a Group III.

Within the Group zonal regions, teams are split into pools and play against each other in a round robin format. The exact format of each Group event, and promotion and relegation between them, varies according to the number of participating teams. Two teams are always promoted from Europe/Africa Group I to that year's World Group II Play-Offs, while one team each go to the World Group II Play-Offs from Americas Group I and Asia/Oceania Zone Group I.

Current structure
This structure has been implemented since 2016.

Ties
In World Group and World Group II, and World Group and World Group II Play-off ties, each tie is contested in a best of five matches format, and is played across two days. On the first day there are two singles matches, and then the reverse singles matches take place on the following day. The final match is a doubles.

In Zonal Groups I, II and III, ties are played over the best of three matches (two singles and a doubles).

The First Round Ties in the World Group and World Group II are played on a home and away knock-out basis, and take place over a weekend in the early part of the year.

World Group Semi-finals and Final are played over on a home and away knock-out basis, and take place over a weekend in July (Semi-finals) and September (Final).

Play-off ties for World Group and World Group II will also be played on a home and away knock-out basis taking place in July.

The choice of ground for First Round, Semi-finals and Play-off ties is decided by lot or goes automatically to one of the competing nations.

As Groups I, II and III are played in a round robin format in all three zones, each event takes place at a single venue over one week. These are held in the first half of the year (to allow promotion of teams to the World Group II Play-off ties in the second half of the year), and dates and venues are decided by the BJK Cup Committee.

Records and statistics

List of championship finals

Performance by country 

Source:

Titles by country (since 1995)

Results by country in BJK Cup Finals

Team records 
 Consecutive titles
 All-time: 7, 1976–1982
 Consecutive finals appearances
 All-time: 8, 1973–1980
 Most number of games in a tie
 Best of Five Format: 162,  4–1 , 1997 World Group First Round
 Best of Three Format: 104,  2–1 , 1977 Consolation Second Round
Years present in BJK Cup Finals

  2
  1
  2
  2
  2
  1
  1
  1
  1
  1
  1
  1
  2
  2
  2
  2

Individual records 
 Youngest player
 Denise Panagopoulou; ; 12 years, 360 days1
 Oldest player
 Gill Butterfield; ; 52 years, 162 days
 Most rubbers played
 100, Arantxa Sánchez Vicario, 
 Most ties played
 74, Anne Kremer, 
 Most rubbers won
 Total: 72, Arantxa Sánchez Vicario, Spain
 Singles: 50, Arantxa Sánchez Vicario, Spain
 Doubles: 38, Larisa Savchenko-Neiland,  / 
 Longest rubber
 2016 World Group First Round: Richèl Hogenkamp,  defeated Svetlana Kuznetsova,  in 4 hours, 7–6(7–4), 5–7, 10–8.
 Most successful captain
 Petr Pála; 6 titles, 

1Players must now be aged 14 and over

Heart Award

The Heart Award is the ITF's annual "MVP" award related to the Billie Jean King Cup, which "aims to recognise players who have represented their country with distinction, shown exceptional courage on court and demonstrated outstanding commitment to the team." The award was inaugurated in 2009.

Current rankings
For more information, see ITF rankings

†Change since previous ranking update

Source:

Broadcasters

See also

 Junior Davis Cup and Junior Billie Jean King Cup
 International Tennis Federation
 Davis Cup
 Hopman Cup
 Wightman Cup
 United Cup

References

External links

 Official Billie Jean King Cup website
1995 Fed Cup

 
World cups
Women's tennis tournaments
Recurring sporting events established in 1963
World championships in racquet sports
Annual sporting events
International tennis competitions